Priestfield railway station was a junction station built by the Oxford, Worcester and Wolverhampton Railway in 1854. It was situated on the junction of the Oxford-Worcester-Wolverhampton Line and the London Paddington to Birkenhead via Birmingham Snow Hill. The station closed in 1972, although mainline services were withdrawn by 1967, and only single railcars operated to Snow Hill, the OWW Line closing in 1962. It was the first station south of Wolverhampton Low Level. After the withdrawal of passenger services, the line remained open to goods trains until December 1982.

Today, Priestfield refers to the Midland Metro stop a short distance away from the station's original position. The tram line opened on 31 May 1999, restoring the use of the line after more than 16 years in disuse and to serve the Snow Hill-Low Level Line while the Dudley-Wolverhampton Line has been since built on and redeveloped.  However the location of the former railway junction can be detected by a distinct gap in the right-hand embankment as the Metro line turns under the adjacent road bridge.

References

Further reading

Disused railway stations in Wolverhampton
Former Great Western Railway stations
Railway stations in Great Britain opened in 1854
Railway stations in Great Britain closed in 1972